José Loayza Pedraza (born September 9, 1976 in Santa Cruz de la Sierra) is a Bolivian retired football defender.

Club career
Loayza has spent his entire career in the Liga de Fútbol Profesional Boliviano. His former teams include Jorge Wilstermann, Blooming, Real Potosí, La Paz F.C., Oriente Petrolero, Real Mamoré, Nacional Potosi and finishing his career with Universitario de Sucre.

National team
Between 1999 and 2003, Loayza made 5 appearances for the Bolivia national team.

References

External links
 
 

1976 births
Living people
Sportspeople from Santa Cruz de la Sierra
Bolivian footballers
Bolivia international footballers
Association football defenders
C.D. Jorge Wilstermann players
Club Blooming players
Club Real Potosí players
La Paz F.C. players
Oriente Petrolero players
Municipal Real Mamoré players
Nacional Potosí players
Universitario de Sucre footballers